Baylor is a surname. Notable people with the surname include:

 George Baylor (1752–1784), American brevet brigadier general during the American Revolutionary War
 Robert Emmett Bledsoe Baylor (1793–1874), American politician, judge, and founder of Baylor University, nephew of George
 John R. Baylor (1822–1894), US Indian agent, publisher, editor, and Confederate politician and colonel during the American Civil War
 William S. Baylor (1831–1862), American lawyer and Confederate colonel in the American Civil War
 George W. Baylor (1832–1916), Texas lawman and Confederate colonel in the American Civil War
 Frances Courtenay Baylor (1848–1920), American author
 Adelaide Steele Baylor (1860–1935), American educator and school administrator
 Hal Baylor, stage name of Hal Fieberling (1918–1998), American actor
 Gracia Baylor (born 1929), Australian politician
 Elgin Baylor (1934–2021), American basketball player
 Don Baylor (1949–2017), American baseball player, coach and manager
 Helen Baylor, stage name of Helen LaRue Lowe (born 1954), American singer-songwriter
 John Baylor (American football) (born 1954), American football player
 Tim Baylor (born 1954), American football player
 B. J. Baylor (born 1998), American football player

See also
 Bob Bailor (born 1951), American former Major League Baseball player